Zylberschtein's is a Jewish deli and bakery in the Pinehurst neighborhood of northern Seattle, Washington, United States. The deli is named after owner Josh Grunig's great grandfather Morris Zylberschtein.

Description 
Owned by Josh Grunig, the delicatessen offers bagels and other breads, sandwiches, cakes, and pastries such as Hamentashen. For Hanukkah, the deli has served "brisket-and-latke" dinners and offered special take-out meals. For Passover Seder, Zylberschtein's has sold take-out meals with vegetarian jackfruit brisket, roasted vegetables, matzo ball or roast vegetable soup, charoset, and matzah. In 2022, the meals included brisket, harissa roasted chicken, caraway carrots, fingerling potatoes, matzo ball soup, chopped liver, and coconut chocolate macaroons.

History

Grunig, a graduate of the San Francisco Baking Institute, worked at Grand Central Bakery before starting his own business—named Standard Bakery—in 2016. Standard Bakery operated from a single location in Pinehurst and was renamed to Zylberschtein's in 2018. It was also converted from a bakery to a Jewish-style deli at this time. The conversion was funded with a $50,000 Kickstarter campaign launched in August 2018.

Reception 
Alana Al-Hatlani included the deli in Eater Seattle's 2022 list of "10 Sensational Bagel Shops Around the Seattle Area".

See also 

 List of Jewish delis

References

External links
 

Jewish delicatessens in the United States
Jews and Judaism in Seattle
Restaurants in Seattle
Delicatessens in Washington (state)